Narasaraopet Municipality is the local self government in Narasaraopet of the Indian state of Andhra Pradesh. It is classified as a first grade municipality.

History 
The municipality is as old as a century, with its formation dating back to 18 May 1915. It got upgraded to first grade municipality on 28 April 1980.

Administration

Narasaraopet municipality is also a part of Narasaraopet urban agglomeration. 

The Elected Wing of the municipality consists of a municipal council, which has elected members and is headed by a Chairperson. Whereas, the  Executive Wing is headed by a municipal commissioner. The present municipal commissioner of the city is J.Siva Ram Krishna and the present chairman is N.Subbaraya Guptha.

Civic works and services
The municipality oversees works such as, road widening, underground drainage, street lights, public and private toilets etc., and also a forefront in implementing the Swachh Bharat Abhiyan. Construction of houses for poor, providing cooking gas connections etc., are also some of the other initiatives of the municipality.

Projects

Narasaraopet is one of the seven municipalities, along with Vijayawada and Guntur Municipal Corporations to be a part of a 15 MW waste-to-energy plant project. It is planned to be set up with the collaboration of the JITF Urban Infrastructure Limited.

Awards and achievements
The municipality completed its centenary fete, as it completed hundred years of its formation. The city is one among the 31 cities in the state to be a part of water supply and sewerage services mission known as Atal Mission for Rejuvenation and Urban Transformation (AMRUT). In 2015, as per the Swachh Bharat Abhiyan of the Ministry of Urban Development, Narasaraopet Municipality was ranked 59th in the country.

See also
 List of municipalities in Andhra Pradesh

References

1915 establishments in India
Government agencies established in 1915
Urban local bodies in Andhra Pradesh